There are nearly 200 post-secondary institutions in the U.S. state of Minnesota. The Twin Cities campus of the public University of Minnesota is the largest university in the state with 51,721 enrolled for fall 2010, making it the sixth-largest American campus by enrollment size. The University of Minnesota system has four other campuses in Crookston, Duluth, Morris, and Rochester. Minnesota State University, referred to as the flagship of the Minnesota State system, is the second-largest university in the state.

The University of St. Thomas in St. Paul is Minnesota's largest private university or college with a fall 2010 enrollment of 10,815 students. Center City-based Hazelden Graduate School of Addiction Studies is the state's smallest postsecondary institution, while Century College in White Bear Lake is Minnesota's largest community and technical college.

The majority of Minnesota's post-secondary institutions are accredited by the Higher Learning Commission (HLC), but 22 have received accreditation from the Accrediting Council for Independent Colleges and Schools (ACICS). Most are accredited by multiple agencies, such as the Commission on Collegiate Nursing Education (CCNE), the National Council for Accreditation of Teacher Education (NCATE), the National League for Nursing (NLNAC), and the American Psychological Association (APA).

While the University of Minnesota was chartered by the state in 1851, it did not operate as a place of higher education for nearly two decades. St. Paul-based Hamline University is considered the state's oldest private college or university, being founded in 1854 as a Methodist coeducational institution. Mayo Medical School, the University of Minnesota, and University of Minnesota Duluth feature the only medical schools in the state. Mitchell Hamline School of Law, the University of Minnesota Law School, and the University of St. Thomas School of Law are American Bar Association-accredited law schools.

Extant institutions

Defunct institutions

Out-of-state institutions
 National for-profit institution Anthem Education Group has a campus in St. Louis Park that offers associate's degrees.
 National for-profit institution DeVry University operates a campus in Edina that offers associate's, bachelor's, and master's degrees.
 National for-profit institution Herzing University operates a campus in Crystal that offers associate's, bachelor's, and master's degrees.
 National for-profit institution ITT Technical Institute operates a campus in Eden Prairie that offers associate's and bachelor's degrees.

Key

See also

 List of college athletic programs in Minnesota
 Higher education in the United States
 List of American institutions of higher education

Notes

References

Bibliography

External links
Department of Education listing of accredited institutions in Minnesota

 
Minnesota
Colleges and universities